Knolls is an unincorporated community in north-central Tooele County, Utah, United States.

Description
The community is located in Great Salt Lake Desert in the western portion of the state, close to the Utah Test and Training Range. Exit 41 on Interstate 80 (I‑80) provides access to Knolls.

Prior to the building of I‑80, Knolls was serviced by U.S. Route 40 and was the eastern terminus of the Wendover Cut-off.

During the 1970s and up until 1985 (possibly longer) one family owned and operated the entire town, consisting of a towing service, a small convenience store, a gas station, and a small motel. There was no water on site, and water had to be trucked in by a small tank truck. The town was for sale for a relatively small amount in 1985. There is photo evidence of a small tavern at one time. There is little visible evidence that there was ever any town, buildings, or gas station left.

The landscape contains mud flats, salt flats, and gypsum sand dunes. Much of the surrounding land is owned by the Bureau of Land Management and is maintained as an off highway vehicle park, known as the Knolls Recreation Area.

Knolls is the site of one place listed on the National Register of Historic Places: the GAPA Launch Site, which is a concrete bunker and missile launch pad where the first Ground to Air Pilotless Aircraft missile was successfully tested in 1946. The site is marked by a placard installed by the Utah State History division.

Knolls is also the site of a hazardous waste dump site known as Grassy Mountain.

The community is named for the many knolls in the area.

Climate
The Great Salt Lake Desert experiences a desert climate with hot summers and cold winters. The desert is an excellent example of a cold desert climate, rare outside of North America. Due to the high elevation and aridity, temperatures drop sharply after sunset. Summer nights are comfortably cool. Winter highs are generally above freezing, and winter nights are bitterly cold, with temperatures often dropping close to zero.

See also

References

External links

Unincorporated communities in Tooele County, Utah
Unincorporated communities in Utah
Great Salt Lake Desert